|}

The European Breeders Fund Novices' Handicap Hurdle Final is a Premier Handicap National Hunt hurdle race in Great Britain which is open to horses aged between four and seven. It is run at Sandown Park over a distance of about 2 miles and 4 furlongs (2 miles, 3 furlongs and 173 yards, or ), and during its running there are nine hurdles to be jumped. It is a handicap race for novices, and it is scheduled to take place each year in March. It is currently sponsored by Betfair.  The race was first run in 1998.

The race is restricted to horses which have placed in the first four in a qualifying race during the current season. In 2022–23 there were 36 scheduled qualifiers between October and February. The race held Grade 3 status until 2022 and was reclassified as a Premier Handicap from the 2023 running when Grade 3 status was renamed by the British Horseracing Authority.

Winners
 Weights given in stones and pounds.

See also
 Horse racing in Great Britain
 List of British National Hunt races

References

Racing Post:

National Hunt hurdle races
Sandown Park Racecourse
National Hunt races in Great Britain
Recurring sporting events established in 1998
1998 establishments in England